was established in Kōchi, Kōchi Prefecture, Japan in 1993. It is one of Japan's many museums which are supported by a prefecture.

The permanent collection includes works by local artists as well as Marc Chagall, a very large collection of photographs and personal items owned by Yasuhiro Ishimoto, and there is also a stage for Noh and other performances.

See also
 Prefectural museum

References

External links
	 
  The Museum of Art, Kōchi
  The Museum of Art, Kōchi

Museums in Kōchi Prefecture
Art museums and galleries in Japan
Prefectural museums
Art museums established in 1993
1993 establishments in Japan
 Kōchi